Albert Arrowsmith was an Australian rugby league footballer who played one match as a winger for the Eastern Suburbs against Glebe in 1918.

References

Year of birth missing
Year of death missing
Australian rugby league players
Rugby league players from New South Wales
Sydney Roosters players